Prunus stellipila is a species of Prunus native to central China, preferring to grow at 1000–1800m. It is a tree typically 6–9m tall, but reaching 20m.

Uses
People in rural Shaanxi province use its wood to make items of furniture, and particularly favor it for making chopping boards. They refer to it as 苦桃, "bitter peach".

References

External links

stellipila
Bird cherries
Endemic flora of China
Plants described in 1911